Mirko Radović (born 15 June 1990) is a Montenegrin handball player for RK Eurofarm Pelister and the Montenegrin national team.

References

External links

1990 births
Living people
Montenegrin male handball players
Sportspeople from Cetinje
Expatriate handball players
Montenegrin expatriate sportspeople in France
Montenegrin expatriate sportspeople in Hungary
Montenegrin expatriate sportspeople in North Macedonia
Mediterranean Games competitors for Montenegro
Competitors at the 2018 Mediterranean Games